Jalan Kawasan Perindustrian Gebeng, or Jalan Gebeng 1/11, Federal Route 3485, is an industrial federal road in Pahang state, Malaysia.

At most sections, the Federal Route 3486 was built under the JKR R5 road standard, allowing maximum speed limit of up to 90 km/h.

List of junctions

References

Malaysian Federal Roads